KXTQ-FM (106.5 FM), known as "Magic 106.5", is a radio station owned by Ramar Communications Inc. of Lubbock. The station's community of license is Lubbock, Texas, and it serves the greater Lubbock area at 106.5 MHz with an ERP of 34 kW. Its studios and transmitter are located in south Lubbock.

106.5 History
106.5 began broadcasting in October 1992 as Tejano music KEJS-FM POWER 106. It was co-owned with the West Texas Hispanic News as a service of Barton Broadcasting, Inc.

On August 11, 2015, Ramar Communications entered into an agreement with Barton Broadcasting to swap frequencies 104.3 for 106.5. When the swap was closed on December 18, 2015, at 10 AM five radio stations simultaneously relocated to new frequencies on "Radio Moving Day", Double T moved to 97.3, Magic moved to 106.5, YES FM! moved to 107.7, The Eagle moved to 93.7 and POWER moved to 104.3, . On January 6, 2016 KLZK changed their call letters to KXTQ-FM.

References

External links
Ramar Communications Website

XTQ-FM
Radio stations established in 1992
1992 establishments in Texas